Cherry Willingham is a large village and civil parish in the West Lindsey district of Lincolnshire, England. The population at the 2011 census was 3,506. Neighbouring villages are Reepham, Nettleham and Fiskerton.

The village is twinned with the French village Le Grand-Lucé.

The village has two schools, Cherry Willingham Primary School and the Priory Pembroke Academy, shopping centre, library, surgery, two pubs, a church and a chapel.

References

External links
 
 Cherry Willingham Website
 Cherry Willingham Parish Council
 

Villages in Lincolnshire
Civil parishes in Lincolnshire
West Lindsey District